Lazy Ramadi is a 2006 spoof of the Saturday Night Live music video "Lazy Sunday", produced and played by SSG Josh Dobbs and SSG Matt Wright. Also appearing is SPC Adam Foster (aka "punching bag") with music and sound by SPC Andre Franklin. Inspired by the "Lazy Muncie" response video, it is based in Ramadi, Iraq and touches on the life of soldiers stationed there.

Media 
It has received media coverage, including  The Discovery Channel, MTV, ABC, NBC and The Indy Channel

Background
SSG Dobbs and SSG Wright are from Muncie, Indiana, which is referenced somewhat in their video. They have also been vocal in their like for their local Pizza King and for the Military Channel of the Discovery Channel Family which they described as being "My favorite new channel". 

Wright is also seen on the LazyRamadi website in the Colts colors and along with the message "Go Colts!, No I really mean it if you choke again I'm going to be pissed". More spoofs such as Ramadi PI after Magnum P.I. can be found on their website, as well as a humorous video teaching fellow soldier SPC Downey how to dance in "Laffy Taffy Dance Party". A few more videos can be found also.

Charity
The creators of Lazy Ramadi have utilized the fame of their video to bring attention to military and veteran charities including Disabled American Veterans,U.S Wounded Soldiers and after their CNN interview,Home for our troops and Coalition to Support American Heroes

External links
 Lazy Ramadi Official Site
Mass media in Iraq